Let the Wind Blow is the 31st studio album by Christian music vocal group The Imperials released in 1985. It is their first album on Word Records' Myrrh label after nearly a decade on DaySpring Records, another Word affiliated label. The group saw its biggest turnover since Terry Blackwood and Sherman Andrus' departure when both Paul Smith and long-time tenor Jim Murray left the group. Smith opted for a solo CCM career while Murray sought to perform more traditionally styled gospel music again. Smith was replaced by Danny Ward on tour to promote Let the Wind Blow, but he left before recording an album with the group. New members Jimmie Lee Sloas and Ron Hemby joined veteran members Armond Morales and David Will in 1986 to record their next album This Year's Model (1987). The group was nominated for a Grammy Award for Best Gospel Performance by a Duo or Group at the 28th Grammy Awards. The album peaked at number 4 on the Billboard Top Inspirational Albums chart.

Track listing

Personnel 

The Imperials
 Paul Smith – lead vocals
 Jim Murray – tenor, vocals
 David Will – baritone, vocals
 Armond Morales – bass, vocals

Musicians
 Robbie Buchanan – synthesizers (1, 2, 3, 5, 6, 7), Rhodes piano (2, 3, 5, 6, 8), synth bass (2)
 Shane Keister – additional synthesizers (3, 9)
 Michael W. Smith – keyboards (4), acoustic piano (10), Fairlight CMI (10)
 Keith Thomas – acoustic piano (6, 8), synthesizers (6), keyboards (9)
 Bill Purse – keyboards (7)
 John Andrew Schreiner – additional synthesizers (9)
 Rhett Lawrence – Fairlight programming (10)
 Dann Huff – guitars (1-9), guitar solo (4)
 Nathan East – bass (1, 2, 3, 5, 6, 8, 9)
 Mike Brignardello – bass (4, 7)
 Paul Leim – drums (1-9)
 Paulinho da Costa – percussion (1, 2, 4, 6, 8)
 Doug Dana – horns (1, 8)
 Larry Williams – horns (1, 8)
 Berwyn Linton – horns (1, 8)
 Bill Reichenbach Jr. – horns (1, 8)
 Chuck Findley – horns (1, 8)
 Gary Grant – horns (1, 8)
 Jerry Hey – horns (1, 8), horn arrangements (1, 8)

Production
 Michael Blanton – executive producer, album concept
 Dan Harrell – executive producer 
 Brown Bannister – producer, vocal arrangements 
 The Imperials – vocal arrangements 
 Jack Joseph Puig – engineer, mixing
 Steve Ford – assistant engineer 
 Dan Garcia – assistant engineer 
 Alan Henry – assistant engineer 
 Clark Schleicher – assistant engineer 
 The Mastering Lab (Hollywood, California) – mastering location 
 Bob Golden – album concept
 Michael Halvig – album concept
 Kent Hunter – album concept, art direction, design 
 Dan Johnson – album concept
 Roger Sanders – album concept
 Mark Tucker – album concept, photography 
 Ken Wolgemuth – album concept
 Thomas Ryan Design – art direction, design 
 Daniel Buehler – computer imagery 
 Dr. Frank Marks – Doppler radar image

Critical reception
Evan Cater of AllMusic has said that the "arrangements are loaded with the tinny, cheap-sounding keyboards that dominated pop in the '80s, although 'Miracles' features an almost -- can this word really be applied to the Imperials? -- funky bass intro. If you happen to come across a dust-covered copy in your church basement, you might consider throwing this one on."

Charts

Radio singles

References

1985 albums
The Imperials albums
Myrrh Records albums
Word Records albums